In finance, market exposure (or exposure) is a measure of the proportion of money invested in the same industry sector. For example, a stock portfolio with a total worth of $500,000, with $100,000 in semiconductor industry stocks, would have a 20% exposure in "chip" stocks.

References 

Finance theories
Investment